4-Isopropenylphenol is an organic compound with the formula .  The molecule consists of a 2-propenyl group (CH2=C-CH3) affixed to the 4 position of phenol. The compound is an intermediate in the production of bisphenol A (BPA), 2.7 Mkg/y of which are produced annually (2007).  It is also generated by the recycling of o,p-BPA, a byproduct of the production of the p,p-isomer of BPA.

Synthesis and reactions
The high-temperature hydrolysis of BPA gives the title compound together with phenol:

The compound can also be produced by catalytic dehydrogenation of 4-isopropylphenol.  

4-Isopropenylphenol undergoes O-protonation by sulfuric acid, giving the carbocation, which undergoes a variety of dimerization reactions.

References

Phenols
Commodity chemicals
Isopropenyl compounds